Qaleh-ye Qobad (also Romanized as Qal‘eh-ye Qobād and Qal‘eh Qobād; also known as Qal‘eh Kabūd) is a village in Dorudfaraman Rural District, in the Central District of Kermanshah County, Kermanshah Province, Iran. At the 2006 census, its population was 113, in 22 families.

References 

Populated places in Kermanshah County